Njoya may refer to:

Ibrahim Njoya (1870–1933), ruled the Bamum people of Cameroon from 1885 until 1931, an intellectual, builder and inventor
Seidou Njimoluh Njoya (1902–1992), ruled the Bamum people of Cameroon from 1933 to 1992
Adamou Ndam Njoya (born 1942), Cameroonian lawyer, author, professor, politician, and former presidential candidate